Royal Air Force Snailwell or more simply RAF Snailwell is a former Royal Air Force station located near to the village of Snailwell, Cambridgeshire, located  north of Newmarket, Suffolk, England.

History
 USAAF 347th Fighter Squadron

Operational Royal Air Force units and aircraft
 No. 56 Squadron RAF (1942) - Hawker Typhoon IA and IB.
 No. 137 Squadron RAF (1942) - Westland Whirlwind I.
 No. 152 (Hyderabad) Squadron RAF (1941) - Supermarine Spitfire IIA.
 No. 168 Squadron RAF (1942) - Curtiss Tomahawk II.
 No. 170 Squadron RAF (1943) - North American Mustang I.
 No. 181 Squadron RAF (1943) - Hawker Typhoon IB.
 No. 182 Squadron RAF (1943) - Hawker Typhoon IB.
 No. 183 (Gold Coast) Squadron RAF (1943) - Hawker Typhoon IB.
 No. 184 Squadron RAF (1943) - Hawker Hurricane IV.
 No. 247 (China-British) Squadron RAF (1943) - Hawker Typhoon IB.
 No. 268 Squadron RAF (1941) - Curtiss Tomahawk IIA.
 No. 268 Squadron RAF (1942) - North American Mustang I.
 No. 309 Polish Fighter-Reconnaissance Squadron (1943) - North American Mustang I.
 No. 527 Squadron RAF (1944) - Hawker Hurricane IIB.
 No. 613 (City of Manchester) Squadron RAuxAF (1943) - North American Mustang I.
Units

Current use
The site has now returned to agriculture and paddocks.

References

Citations

Bibliography

Royal Air Force stations in Cambridgeshire
Royal Air Force stations of World War II in the United Kingdom
Newmarket, Suffolk
Cambridgeshire